The 2001 All-Big Ten Conference football team consists of American football players chosen as All-Big Ten Conference players for the 2001 NCAA Division I-A football season.  The conference recognizes two official All-Big Ten selectors: (1) the Big Ten conference coaches selected separate offensive and defensive units and named first- and second-team players (the "Coaches" team); and (2) a panel of sports writers and broadcasters covering the Big Ten also selected offensive and defensive units and named first- and second-team players (the "Media" team).

Offensive selections

Quarterbacks
 Antwaan Randle El, Indiana (Coaches-1; Media-1)
 Kurt Kittner, Illinois (Coaches-2; Media-2)

Running backs
 Anthony Davis, Wisconsin (Coaches-1; Media-1)
 Levron Williams, Indiana (Coaches-1; Media-1)
 Jonathan Wells, Ohio State (Coaches-2; Media-2)
 Ladell Betts, Iowa (Coaches-2)
 T. J. Duckett, Michigan State (Media-2)

Receivers
 Lee Evans, Wisconsin (Coaches-1; Media-1)
 Marquise Walker, Michigan, (Coaches-1; Media-1)
 Brandon Lloyd, Illinois (Coaches-2; Media-2)
 Ron Johnson, Minnesota (Coaches-2)
 Charles Rogers, Michigan State (Media-2)

Centers
 LeCharles Bentley, Ohio State (Coaches-1; Media-1)
 Luke Butkus, Illinois (Coaches-2; Media-2)

Guards
 Jay Kulaga, Illinois (Coaches-1; Media-1)
 Eric Steinbach, Iowa (Coaches-1; Media-2) 
 Jonathan Goodwin, Michigan (Media-1)
 Enoch DeMar, Indiana (Coaches-2; Media-2)
 Jonathan Goodwin, Michigan (Coaches-2)

Tackles
 Tony Pashos, Illinois (Coaches-1; Media-1)
 Tyson Walter, Ohio State (Coaches-1; Media-1)
 Ben Johnson, Wisconsin (Coaches-2; Media-2)
 David Porter, Iowa (Coaches-2; Media-2)

Tight ends
 Mark Anelli, Wisconsin (Coaches-1)
 Tim Stratton, Purdue (Media-1)
 Ben Utecht, Minnesota (tie) (Coaches-2)
 Chris Baker, Michigan State (tie) (Coaches-2; Media-2)

Defensive selections

Defensive linemen
 Akin Ayodele, Purdue (Coaches-1; Media-1)
 Wendell Bryant, Wisconsin (Coaches-1; Media-1)
 Mike Collins, Ohio State (Coaches-2)
 Napoleon Harris, Northwestern (Coaches-2; Media-2)
 Aaron Kampman, Iowa (Coaches-2; Media-1)
 Jimmy Kennedy, Penn State (Coaches-1; Media-2)
 Matt Mitrione, Purdue (Coaches-1; Media-2)
 Shantee Orr, Michigan (Media-2)
 Dan Rumishek, Michigan (Media-1)
 Josh Shaw, Michigan State (Coaches-2)

Linebackers
 Larry Foote, Michigan (Coaches-1; Media-1) 
 Nick Greisen, Wisconsin (Coaches-1; Media-1) 
 Josh Thornhill, Michigan State (Coaches-1; Media-1)
 Victor Hobson, Michigan (Coaches-2; Media-2)
 Kevin Bentley, Northwestern (Coaches-2)
 Joe Cooper, Ohio State (Coaches-2)
 Jerry Schumacher, Illinois (Media-2)
 Justin Smith, Indiana (Media-2)

Defensive backs
 Jack Brewer, Minnesota (Media-1)
 Mike Doss, Ohio State (Coaches-1; Media-1)
 Mike Echols, Wisconsin (Coaches-1; Media-2)
 Todd Howard, Michigan (Coaches-2)
 Bobby Jackson, Illinois (Coaches-2)
 Christian Morton, Illinois (Media-2)
 Derek Ross, Ohio State (Coaches-2; Media-2)
 Bob Sanders, Iowa (Coaches-1; Media-2)
 Stuart Schweigert, Purdue (Coaches-2; Media-1)
 Eugene Wilson, Illinois (Coaches-1; Media-1)

Special teams

Kickers
 Travis Dorsch, Purdue (Coaches-1; Media-1)
 Hayden Epstein, Michigan (Coaches-2)
 Peter Christofilakos, Illinois (Media-2)

Punters
 Travis Dorsch, Purdue (Coaches-1; Media-1)
 Andy Groom, Ohio State (Coaches-2; Media-2)

Key
Bold = selected as a first-team player by both the coaches and media panel

Coaches = selected by Big Ten Conference coaches

Media = selected by a media panel

See also
2001 College Football All-America Team

References

All-Big Ten Conference
All-Big Ten Conference football teams